The Oratorio dei Disciplini is a Roman Catholic oratory, or small church, located in Ostiano in the province of Cremona, region of Lombardy, Italy.

History
This oratory was erected in 1606 by a flagellant confraternity, and dedicated to the Virgin of the Assumption. The interior is notable for life-size canvas depictions of eight saints, painted by Giuseppe Tortelli.

References

Churches in the province of Cremona
17th-century Roman Catholic church buildings in Italy
Roman Catholic churches completed in 1606
1606 establishments in Italy